Serooskerke is a village in the Dutch province of Zeeland. It is a part of the municipality of Veere, and lies about 6 km north of Middelburg.

History 
The village was first mentioned before 1207 as Alerdeskirkam, and means "(private) church of Alard (person)". Serooskerke is a circular church village which developed in the 12th century on a ridge. Monastery Mariëndaal was built south of the village in the 13th century. It was destroyed in 1574.

The Dutch Reformed church is a single aisled church with a wide tower. The tower dates from the 15th century. The church was destroyed between 1572 and 1574 and later rebuilt.

Serooskerke was home to 892 people in 1840. It was a separate municipality until 1966, when it was merged with Veere. 

In 1966, a farm worker was digging the field near the fire station and discovered a golden coin. Almost 1,100 golden coins from the late 16th and early 17th century were discovered. The municipality was entitled to half the proceeds and built a swimming pool from the money.

Gallery

References

External links

Populated places in Zeeland
Former municipalities of Zeeland
Veere